The Potchefstroom Koekoek is a South African breed of chicken  developed in the 1960s at the Potchefstroom Agricultural College in the city of Potchefstroom by Chris Marais. It was developed by cross breeding a number of other breeds like Black Australorp, White Leghorn, and Barred Plymouth Rock to obtain specific characteristics of each, making the resulting breed more suitable to Southern African conditions.

The breed was intended as a dual purpose, free ranging chicken with laying capabilities as well as a large structure for meat production. Pure Koekoeks have a black-and-white barred appearance, with the chicks sexable soon after hatching due to distinct sex markings. Potchefstroom Koekoeks maintain good egg production even with poor quality or insufficient feeding.

See also
 List of chicken breeds
 Agriculture in South Africa

References 

Chicken breeds originating in South Africa
Chicken breeds